Pilo may refer to:

People

Surname
 Carl Gustaf Pilo (1711–1793), Swedish artist and painter
 Craig Pilo
 Mehro Pilo

Given name
 Pilo Hilbay (born 1973), Filipino lawyer
 Pilo Keri (born 1956), Albanian politician
 Pilo Peristeri (1909–2009), Albanian politician

Other
 Pilo, or kadua laxiflora